Mark Twain Historic District is a national historic district located at Hannibal, Marion County, Missouri.   The district encompasses 20 contributing buildings in the central business district of Hannibal. It developed between about 1840 and 1936. Located in the district is the separately listed Mark Twain Boyhood Home.  Other notable buildings include the Ice House Theatre (c. 1885), Randall House Antiques (c. 1845), Information Center (c. 1845), House of the Pilasters & Grant's Drug Store (1839-1844), "Becky Thatcher" House (c. 1840s), and the Mark Twain Memorial Lighthouse (1936).

It was listed on the National Register of Historic Places in 1978.

References

Mark Twain
Historic districts on the National Register of Historic Places in Missouri
Buildings and structures in Marion County, Missouri
National Register of Historic Places in Marion County, Missouri
1978 establishments in Missouri